EOG may refer to:

 Electrooculography
 Electro-olfactography
 EOG Resources, an American oil and natural gas company
 Eye of GNOME, an image viewer
 Orthodox Church of the Gauls
 Extreme Operating Gust, a wind situation relevant in wind turbine design